The Norwegian Farmers and Smallholders Union is a Norwegian interest organization for farmers.

It functions both as a labour union and as a trade union. It was founded in 1913, and negotiates together with the Norwegian Agrarian Association against the Norwegian Ministry of Labour and Social Inclusion about agricultural subsidies.

Its secretary-general is Vilde Haarsaker, and the chair is Tor Jacob Solberg. It has 7,000 members, with 260 local chapters and 18 county chapters. The headquarters are in Oslo. The members' newspaper is Bonde og Småbruker.

References

Trade unions in Norway
Employers' organisations in Norway
Agricultural organisations based in Norway
Organisations based in Oslo
Trade unions established in 1913
1913 establishments in Norway
Farmers' organizations